Escolano is a Spanish surname.

Notable people with this surname include:
 José Gea Escolano (1929–2017), Spanish prelate
 Luis Mercader Escolano (1444–1516), Spanish grand inquisitor
 Sonia Escolano (born 1980), Spanish director

Spanish-language surnames